Frederica "Faire" Binney (August 24, 1900 – August 28, 1957) her name pronounced like the country Zaire, was an American stage and film actress.

Biography
Born Frederica Binney in Morristown, New Jersey, she was the daughter of Horace Binney, a lawyer, and Gertrude Miles Binney. Her education came in private schools in Concord, Massachusetts. She starred in a number of films during the silent era after making her debut in the 1918 film Sporting Life alongside her sister Constance Binney. During the early 1950s she appeared in several small, uncredited parts.

Binney married David Carleton Sloane in October 1922 in her mother's house in New York.

Selected filmography
 Sporting Life (1918)
 Woman (1918)
 Here Comes the Bride (1919)
 Open Your Eyes (1919)
 The Wonder Man (1920)
 The Blue Pearl (1920)
 Madonnas and Men (1920)
 The Girl from Porcupine (1921)
 A Man's Home (1921)
 Frontier of the Stars (1921)
 A Wide Open Town (1922)
 What Fools Men Are (1922)
 Loyal Lives (1923)
 Second Youth (1924)
 The Man Without a Heart (1924)
 The Speed Spook (1924)
 The Lost Chord (1925)
 False Pride (1925)
 Three Guys Named Mike (1951)
 Monkey Business (1952)
 Dream Wife (1953)

References

Bibliography
 Goble, Alan. The Complete Index to Literary Sources in Film. Walter de Gruyter, 1999.
 John T. Soister, Henry Nicolella & Steve Joyce. American Silent Horror, Science Fiction and Fantasy Feature Films, 1913-1929. McFarland, 2014.

External links

1900 births
1957 deaths
Actresses from New Jersey
American film actresses
People from Morristown, New Jersey
20th-century American actresses
20th-century American people